The MLS Humanitarian of the Year Award, also known as the MLS W.O.R.K.S Humanitarian of the Year Award, is given to a Major League Soccer player who exemplifies both skill on the field and service within the community. This finalists of the award are nominated by their respective teams, then the winner is voted on by the media, players, and club representatives.

Winners

References

External links
 MLSsoccer.com list of winners 2000-2010

Major League Soccer trophies and awards
Humanitarian and service awards